Hypsilurus longi or Long's forest dragon is a species of agama found in Papua New Guinea.

References

Hypsilurus
Taxa named by William John Macleay
Reptiles described in 1877
Agamid lizards of New Guinea